KDB (93.7 MHz) is a non-commercial FM radio station licensed to Santa Barbara, California and serving Santa Barbara County and Ventura County.  It is owned by the University of Southern California and broadcasts a classical music radio format, simulcasting KUSC (91.5 FM) in Los Angeles.  KUSC and KDB air periodic fundraisers on the air, seeking donations and members.

KDB has an effective radiated power of 12,500 watts.  The transmitter is off Gibraltar Road in Santa Barbara, located among the towers for other Santa Barbara FM and TV stations.

History

Beautiful and Classical Music
It was the sister station to KDB 1490 AM (now KOSJ). The AM station went on the air in 1925, an era where many stations were granted three-letter call signs. This is why today's KDB still retains unusual call letters for an FM station. KDB-AM-FM were Santa Barbara's first 24-hour stations. The stations were bought in 1971 by the Pacific Broadcasting Company, consisting of Bob Scott, Harvey Pool, and Dick Marsh. After programming American show tunes and beautiful music for nine years, KDB-FM changed its format to classical music in 1980.

A competing classical music station appeared in Santa Barbara in 1985. Signing on that year was KSCA, a full-power non-commercial station owned by the University of Southern California that served as a repeater of KUSC in Los Angeles. KSCA's call letters changed to KFAC in 1991, then to KQSC in 2004.

Ownership Changes
The KDB-AM-FM combo was split in November 1990 due to an ownership dispute. Pacific Broadcasting sold the AM station, then known as KSPE, to Spectacular Broadcasting for $302,000.

Meanwhile, KDB-FM remained with Bob Scott, his son Roby, and Pool.  Through the 1980s and 90s, many commercial classical stations around the U.S. were sold and their formats changed to more mass-appeal musical genres.  But a few, like WQXR-FM New York City and WCRB Boston were converted to non-profit status.

Non-Profit Status
In 2001, Michael Towbes, David Anderson, and Jean and Barry Schuyler bought KDB-FM with the goal of selling the station to a nonprofit organization that would keep the classical format and local orientation. This happened in November 2003, when the Santa Barbara Foundation purchased the station through a generous donation from Towbes.

In 2010, KDB embarked on a three-year strategic plan to enhance and grow its service to the community with programming that enriched the lives of those who listen. KDB added a Features Producer who created two to three interviews and features per week on the performing, visual and literary arts, as well as the work of local nonprofit organizations. In 2011, KDB entered the world of social media, adding a monthly e-newsletter and Facebook page.

In October 2013, the Santa Barbara Foundation announced that it had put KDB up for sale. In a statement, the station said that it was unable to attract enough revenue from contributing listeners to support KDB's operations, despite an increase in membership revenue. The foundation hoped to sell the station at a discount to interests that would retain the classical format, citing the "continuing community benefit" of continuing this programming. However, the organization also considered full-price offers from groups that would program a format of their choosing, in which case the proceeds would go toward an endowment to support classical music in the area.

KCRW and KUSC Ownership
In February 2014, public radio station KCRW in Santa Monica, California announced that it would buy KDB for $1 million; the sale price was amended to $1.3 million in June. The transaction would allow KCRW to shift its Santa Barbara broadcast coverage from a weak FM translator to the full-powered 88.7 signal then licensed to KQSC. USC moved its classical music programming from 88.7 to KDB's 93.7 frequency, thus continuing KDB's role as Santa Barbara's classical station. On August 28, 2014, the sale was finalized and KDB began simulcasting KUSC's classical format.

KCRW donated much of the KDB studio equipment to KBUU-LP, a startup community radio station in Malibu.  The vintage 1990 broadcast board remains in continuous use at KBUU, with an old KDB logo and its baton-wielding penguin affixed. .

References

External links

FCC History Cards for KDB (FM)

DB
Classical music radio stations in the United States
Radio stations established in 1961
1961 establishments in California